The Speaker of the House of Representatives of the Northern Mariana Islands is the presiding officer of the lower chamber of that legislature, in the Commonwealth of the Northern Mariana Islands (CNMI).

  
The upper chamber is the Northern Mariana Islands Senate.

References

Information through 2012 provided by Simion Lisua, Clerk of the Northern Mariana Islands Legislature

Speakers
Northern Mariana Islands